Natividad Building is a historic building along Escolta corner Tomas Pinpin, Binondo, Manila, Philippines. Designed by Philippine-born Spanish architect Fernando de la Cantera Blondeau, it is an outstanding example of beaux-arts architecture. It once housed the Philippine Insurance Commission. During World War II, the building was spared from destruction albeit suffered some damages.

References

External links

Buildings and structures in Binondo
Tourist attractions in Manila
Office buildings in Metro Manila